Marcelo dos Santos Farias Valverde, better known as Marcelo Valverde (born November 21, 1989 in Rio de Janeiro), is a Brazilian goalkeeper who plays for S.C.U. Torreense in Portugal.

Career
Marcelo Valverde, Marcelinho, began his career in a small school that was held in the condominium where he lives. However, at 10 years, driven by a friend of his father to the Estádio da Gávea, auditioned for the team of Flamengo, has been approved, and is there today, with much success in the youth ranks of red-black.

The young archer is currently the team's youth club, where he has won several titles. Among them, the tricampeonato state under-19 and the same state, however, the Under-17, and Copa OPG and Copa Belo Horizonte.

Next season, in 2008, the goalkeeper will have 19 years, and thus may continue to participate in disputes in the juniors, if not promoted to the professional team.

Marcelo had a defining moment in his career still in the year 2007. When the Brazilian team went to Rio de Janeiro to face Ecuador in a match valid for the 2010 FIFA World Cup qualification, the team trained at Gávea, and Marcelo was called to attend the training.

The year also marked the third place team of Flamengo in the Champions Youth Cup, mundial interclubes U-19 category, where Marcelo was the goalkeeper and one of the highlights of the campaign.

On 1 June 2011, Marcelo joined Primeira Liga side Nacional.

Career statistics
(Correct )

according to combined sources on the Flamengo official website and Flaestatística.

Honours
 Flamengo
Campeonato Carioca de Juniores: 2005, 2006, 2007
Campeonato Carioca de Juvenis: 2006
Copa Macaé de Juvenis: 2006
Taça OPG: 2006
Taça Belo Horizonte de Juniores: 2006, 2007

Contract
 Flamengo.

References

External links
Marcelo Valverde at ZeroZero

Marcelo Valverde at La Preferente

1989 births
Living people
Brazilian footballers
Brazilian expatriate footballers
CR Flamengo footballers
C.D. Nacional players
C.F. União players
Centro de Futebol Zico players
Anápolis Futebol Clube players
Sociedade Esportiva do Gama players
Nacional Futebol Clube players
FC Lusitanos players
S.C.U. Torreense players
Primeira Liga players
Liga Portugal 2 players
Campeonato Brasileiro Série D players
Campeonato de Portugal (league) players
Association football goalkeepers
Brazilian expatriate sportspeople in Portugal
Expatriate footballers in Portugal
Expatriate footballers in Andorra
Brazilian expatriate sportspeople in Andorra
Footballers from Rio de Janeiro (city)